The Cize–Bolozon viaduct is a combination rail and vehicular viaduct crossing the Ain gorge in France connecting the communes of Cize and Bolozon in the Ain département.

An original span built in the same location in 1875 was destroyed in World War II. Reconstructed as an urgent post-war project due to its position on a main line to Paris, the new viaduct reopened in May 1950.

It carries road and rail traffic at different levels: the railway, which was closed for reinforcement and restoration in 2005, occupies the upper level. The local road from Poncin to Thoirette uses the lower level.

See also 

 Cize-Bolozon station

References

External links

Details of the Haut-Bugey line, showing the viaduct

Railway bridges in France
Bridges completed in 1875
Viaducts in France
Bridges completed in 1950